Moscow Architectural Institute (State Academy) - MArchI is a famous architecture school located in Moscow, Russia. Since 1994, the Institute has been accredited by the Royal Institute of British Architects.

MArchI trains architects of wide-range specialization in Town-Planning, Architecture of Residential and Public Buildings, Architectural Design, Architecture of Industrial Buildings, Architecture of Agricultural Complexes, Theory and History of Architecture, Restoration of Architectural Monuments, Interior Architecture, Landscaping.

Since 2010, the academy releases an international electronic scientific and educational magazine "Architecture and Modern Information Technologies".

Organization
The language of education is Russian. The full course of studies lasts 6 years. After that students get the diploma and can work as architects in Russia. After 5 years of education students get the bachelor's diploma.

The Rector of the university is Dmitry Olegovich Shvidkovsky.

There are 28 departments in the Academy, 10 of them are with specialized, 18 are for the whole faculty:

 Architecture of public buildings
 Architecture of industrial structures
 Architecture of rural settlements
 Urban planning
 Reconstruction in architecture
 Restoration in architecture
 Landscape architecture
 History of architecture and urban planning
 Design of Architectural Environment
 Temple Architecture

Notable alumni 
 Rustam Khalfin
 Svetlana Baskova

References

External links
 Official site in English
 www.researchgate.net

Moscow Architectural Institute
1933 establishments in Russia